The northern boundary of the U.S. state of Massachusetts adjoins two other states: Vermont and New Hampshire. The majority of the boundary is roughly a straight line from the northwest corner of the state ( NAD27) east to a point in Dracut, just north of Lowell.

History
The 1629 charter of the Massachusetts Bay Colony gave the colony the land between the Merrimack River and Charles River. The northern border was to be 3 miles north of the northernmost bend of the Merrimack River. Between these lines of latitude the grant extended from the Atlantic to the Pacific. In 1629 the rivers had not been fully explored and the actual borders of the colony were uncertain. It turned out that the southernmost bend of the Charles is south of the southern curve of Massachusetts Bay. The line of latitude three miles south of the river's southernmost bend, approximately 42°2′ north, forms the basis of the southern border of Massachusetts to the present day. The Merrimack River turned out to originate farther north than expected, flowing south for most of its course and only turning eastward in its last several miles. Thus the 1629 grant gave the colony most of what is today New Hampshire and all of the original 1629 grant that formed the basis of colonial New Hampshire, but it took many decades before this was fully understood.

A new charter was granted to the Province of Massachusetts Bay in 1691, which merged the Colony with the Colony of New Plymouth, as well as present-day Maine and New Brunswick. The northern boundary of what was now the southern piece remained as defined in 1629.

The Province of New Hampshire and Province of Massachusetts Bay had disagreements over their mutual boundaries. With respect to the southern boundary of New Hampshire, the two provinces disagreed on the meaning of "three miles northward of the Merrimack River, or any part thereof". New Hampshire drew a line from three miles north of the mouth of the river, while Massachusetts claimed a line three miles north of the northernmost part of the river, taking its territory far north past what is now Concord, New Hampshire. New Hampshire appealed to King George II, who in 1740 decreed the boundary to run along a curved line three miles from the river between the ocean and a point three miles north of Pawtucket Falls (Lowell), where the river begins to turn north. From there a line was to be drawn due west to meet the western boundary of Massachusetts (fixed in 1773 with the Province of New York). The line actually runs slightly northwest to southeast, so it follows no line of latitude.  This gave New Hampshire even more than it had claimed, as Pawtucket Falls was south of the mouth of the Merrimack. At this time, the present northern boundary of Massachusetts was established.  

The location where these two surveyed lines met (the straight westward line and the curved line following the Merrimack River) was marked by a pine tree called the "Old Boundary Pine". The tree was marked by George Mitchell, one of the surveyors, on March 21, 1741 to indicate the location where the lines met. The pine tree is long gone, but the point (officially at ) is today marked by a granite monument known as the Boundary Pine Monument, the current form of which was placed in 1890. Elsewhere, the boundary are made by 50 large granite markers, along with several other markers, including a copper bolt set in granite at the tripoint between Vermont, Massachusetts, and New Hampshire. The "curved" segments roughly following the course of the Merrimack at a distance 3 miles north of it are not true curves, but rather a series of line segments approximating the curved course of the river. Another granite marker, also placed in 1890, stands on the beach between Salisbury, Massachusetts and Seabrook, New Hampshire at 80 feet from the high tide line, marking the end of the surveyed border, with the border taken to extend into the Atlantic Ocean to the "limit of State jurisdiction."  

New Hampshire claimed all the land west to roughly the present western boundary of Vermont, while New York claimed east to the Connecticut River, Vermont's present eastern boundary; thus both states claimed all of Vermont. A ruling by King George III established the ordinary low-water line on the west bank of the Connecticut River to be the border, but the territory between the Connecticut River and Lake Champlain – which had been sold off by New Hampshire – declared independence in 1777 as the Vermont Republic. New Hampshire gave up its claim to Vermont with a boundary agreement in 1782, and New York gave up its claim to Vermont, contingent upon Vermont's admission to the Union, in 1790 (Vermont was admitted to the Union in 1791).

See also
 Southwick Jog, colloquial name of a notch in Massachusetts' southern border with Connecticut

Notes

References

External links
 Fritz Wetherbee: The Old Boundary Pine of Pelham at WMUR-TV

Internal territorial disputes of the United States
Borders of Vermont
Borders of Massachusetts
Borders of New Hampshire